Good Tidings and Great Joy: Protecting the Heart of Christmas is a 2013 book by Sarah Palin that became a New York Times Bestseller. The book makes "an emphatic case for the true meaning of Christmas." The title of the book is an allusion to Luke 2:10 in the New Testament. Palin promoted the book with a 15-city tour. According to Publishers Weekly, the book sold 209,591 copies in 2013.

References 

2013 non-fiction books
American political books
Books about politics of the United States
Books by Sarah Palin
Books critical of modern liberalism in the United States
Christmas books
Current affairs books
Broadside Books books